Andarab may refer to:
 Andarab, East Azerbaijan
 Andarab, Kurdistan